This article provides details of international football games played by the Bahrain national team from 2020 to present.

Results

2020

2021

2022

2023

Head to head records

References

Football in Bahrain
Bahrain national football team
2020s in Bahraini sport